Jamal Uddin Siddiqui is a Pakistani politician who has been a member of the Provincial Assembly of Sindh since August 2018.

Political career

He was elected to the Provincial Assembly of Sindh as a candidate of Pakistan Tehreek-e-Insaf from Constituency PS-106 (Karachi East-VIII) in 2018 Pakistani general election.

References

Living people
Pakistan Tehreek-e-Insaf MPAs (Sindh)
Year of birth missing (living people)